Collard may refer to:

 Collard (plant), certain loose-leafed Brassica oleracea cultivars
 Collard liquor, a soup made from collard greens
 "Collard Greens" (song), a 2013 song by hip hop artist Schoolboy Q

People
 Catherine Collard (1947-1993), French pianist
 Clayton Collard (born 1988), Australian rules footballer
 Emmanuel Collard (born 1971), French racing driver
 Frederick William Collard (1772–1860), British piano manufacturer
 Fred Collard (1912–1986), Australian politician
 Gilbert Collard (born 1948), French writer, barrister and politician
 Jean-Philippe Collard (born 1948), French pianist
 Ora Collard (1902–1961), American businessman and politician
 Paul Collard (1952–2005), U.S. Robotics founder
 Pierre Paul Royer-Collard (1763–1845), French statesman and philosopher
 Ricky Collard (born 1996), British racing driver
 Rob Collard (born 1968), British racing driver
 Stan Collard (born 1936), Australian politician